Thomas Carew (1595–1640) was an English poet.

Thomas Carew may also refer to:
Thomas Carew (MP for Saltash) (1527–1565), English lawyer and politician
Thomas Carew (died 1681) (1624–1681), English lawyer and politician
Sir Thomas Carew, 1st Baronet (1632–1673), English politician, MP for Tiverton 1661–1674
Thomas Carew (1718–1793), Irish politician, MP for Dungarvan 1761–1768
Thomas A. Carew, sculptor in Boston, Massachusetts
Thomas J. Carew, American neuroscientist
Tom Carew, Sierra Leonean army officer
Thomas Carew, real name of Thomas Carve (1590–c. 1672), Irish historian

See also
Carew (disambiguation)